2013 Regional League Division 2 was contested by the five regional league winners and runners up of the 3rd level championships of Thailand. The one best 3rd placed teams from the regional leagues also take part

Twelve teams were split into two groups of A & B, with the top two teams from group A & B gaining promotion to the Yamaha League-1 for the 2014 campaign, along with this, the two group winners would play off to determine the overall champions.

2013 Regional League table All locations

2013
red Zone:2013 Regional League Division 2 Bangkok Metropolitan Region 
Yellow Zone:2013 Regional League Division 2 Central & Eastern Region 
Pink Zone:2013 Regional League Division 2 Central & Western Region 
Green Zone: 2013 Regional League Division 2 Northern Region Region
  Orange Zone:2013 Regional League Division 2 North Eastern Region  
Blue Zone:2013 Regional League Division 2 Southern Region

List of qualified teams
Bangkok & field (2)
 Paknampho NSRU  (Winner)
 Kasetsart (Runner-up)

Central & Eastern (2)
 Look Isan-Thai Airways (Winner)
 Nakhon Nayok (Runner-up)

Central & Western (2)
 Angthong (Winner)
 Prachuap Khiri Khan (Runner-up)

Northern (3)
 Chiangmai (Winner)
 Phitsanulok (Runner-up)
 Sukhothai (3rd, Winner championship pool qualifying play-off)

North Eastern (2)
 Roi Et United (Winner)
 Udon Thani (Runner-up)

Southern (1)
 Nara United (Winner)

Championship Pool Qualifying play-off

† Winner : Sukhothai (Qualification for the championship pool ).

Champions League Round table

Group A

Group B

3/4 Place

First Leg

Second Leg

Phitsanulok won 3–2 on aggregate.

Final
First Leg

Second Leg

Roi Et United won 2–0 on aggregate.

Champions
The Regional Division 2 2013 winners were Roiet United.

See also
2013 Thai Premier League
2013 Thai Division 1 League
2013 Thai FA Cup
2013 Thai League Cup
2013 Kor Royal Cup

External links
Thailand 2013 RSSSF

 
Thai League T4 seasons
3